The Reinado Internacional del Café (International Queen of Coffee) beauty pageant, was internationally launched as the Reinado Continental del Café (Continental Queen of Coffee) in 1957, and the name was changed to the current one in 1972 to allow for the participation of countries from America and other continents. The pageant has always been held in Manizales, Colombia, in January during the Feria de Manizales, and is organized by Instituto de Cultura y Turismo de Manizales annually. More than 20 contestants participate every year. The current titleholder is Isabella Bermudez Nieto from Colombia, who was crowned in January 7, 2023.

Titleholders 

Not held in 1958, 1960, 1962, 1964–71, 1977–78, 1980, 1986 and 2021

Titles By Countries

Reinado Internacional del Café

Virreina Internacional del Café

Primera Princesa

Segunda Princesa

Tercera Princesa

Cuarta Princesa

English Native Representatives

USA on Reina Internacional del Café 
Color key

Canada on Reina Internacional del Café 
Color key

England on Reina Internacional del Café 
Color key

The Bahamas on Reina Internacional del Café 
Color key

See also

 List of beauty contests

References

External links
 Instituto de Cultura y Turismo de Manizales
 Alcaldía de Manizales

 
Beauty pageants in Colombia
Recurring events established in 1957
Caldas Department
International beauty pageants
Continental beauty pageants